The Church of Sainte-Reine in the Diocese of Saint-Flour is a pilgrimage center and miraculous shrine near Virargues, in the Cantal department of France.

See also
Église Saint-Jean-Baptiste

Notes and references

Summed up and translated from the equivalent article at French Wikipédia, 29 May 2008

Shrines to the Virgin Mary
Churches in Cantal
Roman Catholic shrines in France